Events from the year 1781 in Austria

Incumbents
 Monarch – Joseph II

Events

 
 

 
 - Austro-Russian alliance (1781)
 - Serfdom Patent (1781)
 - Theater in der Leopoldstadt

Births

Deaths

References

 
Years of the 18th century in Austria